Megaphone (formerly Panoply Media) is a podcast technology company owned by Spotify, focusing on ad-insertion and hosting. It was formerly an audio content producer started by The Slate Group as Panoply Media, and later shifted to focusing solely on helping companies with production, advertising, and audience metrics.

History 
Slate began podcasting in 2005 with the Slate Political Gabfest. Panoply Media launched in Feb 2015. Slate acquired dynamic ad-insertion company Audiometric in August 2015, and made the functionality available to other companies in January 2016 under the moniker "Megaphone".

, Panoply had published more than 100 podcasts through partnerships with Sports Illustrated, The Huffington Post, New York magazine, Time, Inc., Vox, Real Simple, The Wall Street Journal, and Politico. It has produced branded content for Purina, Umpqua Bank, Prudential and Starbucks.

In January 2018, the Slate Group separated its Slate-branded podcasts, such as The Gist, from the rest of the Panoply lineup, for purposes of revenue control as it sought to increase membership in Slate Plus, its premium content service.  Accordingly, Slate podcasts no longer carry the Panoply logo and branding.

In September 2018, it was announced that Panoply would cease production of all podcasts and shut down its editorial division in order to focus on podcast hosting, analytics, and monetization technology.

The acquisition was completed in December 2020. After the acquisitions of podcast technology companies Whooshkaa in December 2021 and Chartable in February 2022, Spotify announced that these products will be integrated into Megaphone.

Former Panoply branded podcasts 
BuzzFeed
 Internet Explorer
 No One Knows Anything
 See Something Say Something — about being Muslim in America
 Another Round — topics ranging from race, gender and pop culture to squirrels, mangoes, and jokes, hosted by Tracy Clayton and Heben Nigatu

 First Look Media
 Intercepted with Jeremy Scahill — by The Intercept
 Maeve in America — hosted by Maeve Higgins

GE Podcast Theater
 The Message — science fiction, co-produced with Slate
 Life.After

MTV
 Game of Crones — recap of Game of Thrones
 Happy Sad Confused — celebrities
 Lady Problems — women's issues
 North Mollywood
 Skillset
 Speed Dial
 Team Wolf
 The Stakes

Politico
 Nerdcast — politics
 Off Message

Popular Mechanics
 How Your World Works
 Most Useful Podcast Ever

Vanity Fair
 In the Limelight
 Little Gold Men — the Oscar race

Vox
 The Ezra Klein Show
 The Weeds — hosted by Ezra Klein, Sarah Kliff, and Matthew Yglesias

Wall Street Journal
 Heard On the Street
 Media Mix
 Money, Markets & More
 MoneyBeat
 Opinion: Foreign Edition
 Opinion: Potomac Watch
 Tech News Briefing
 Watching Your Wealth
 What's News
 Your Money Matters

Other
 BackStory — a weekly podcast about American history, hosted by Ed Ayers, Brian Balogh, Nathan Connolly and Joanne Freeman
 Bad With Money — hosted by Gabe Dunn
 Girlboss Radio with Sophia Amoruso
 GLoP Culture — with Jonah Goldberg, John Podhoretz, and Rob Long
 Revisionist History — hosted by Malcolm Gladwell
 T. D. Jakes Podcast
 Detective — weekly interviews with Detectives who are being featured on Investigation Discovery true crime shows.
 Tumanbay — international broadcast of this BBC Four scripted radio drama, set in a fictional Middle Eastern city during the Middle Ages. Two seasons have already aired in the UK.
Whatever Happened To Pizza At McDonald's? — investigative journalism program centered around the circumstances and reasoning for fast food chain McDonald's ceasing to offer pizza in their restaurants.
 LGBTQ&A — interview podcast documenting the stories of the LGBTQ community with Jeffrey Masters.
 By the Book — bi-weekly podcast trying out self-help books with Jolenta Greenberg and Kristen Meinzer.
 You Must Remember This — early Hollywood history with Karina Longworth.

Slate branded podcasts
 Amicus — Amicus is a podcast about "the Supreme Court and the laws it interprets for the United States," hosted by Dahlia Lithwick. The podcast first aired October 23, 2014 and has aired a few times a month since
 Audio Book Club — The Audio Book Club functions as a book discussion club. Every month critics gather to discuss a book previously announced. The podcast first aired on March 15, 2006
 Culture Gabfest — a weekly round-table focusing on cultural news, with Stephen Metcalf, Dana Stevens, and Julia Turner. The podcast first aired on April 23, 2008, and airs every Wednesday.
 Daily Podcast — All of Slate's podcasts and extra content.
 Dear Prudence — Dear Prudence is an advice column, hosted by Daniel Mallory Ortberg. The column dates back to 1997, and the podcast to June 7, 2016. The podcast airs every Wednesday
 The Waves — women's issues, formerly The Double X Gabfest 
 The Gist — The Gist is a daily (Monday through Friday) news and opinion podcast hosted by Mike Pesca
 Upon Further Review — Upon Further Review is a limited release podcast hosted by Mike Pesca, focusing on sports hypotheticals, such as, "What would have happened if the Brooklyn Dodgers had never left for Los Angeles?"
 Hang Up and Listen — sports
 Hit Parade — music history and the Billboard Hot 100, hosted by Chris Molanphy.
 Lexicon Valley — language issues
 Slate Money — business and finance, hosted by Felix Salmon
 Mom and Dad Are Fighting — parenting
 Slate Political Gabfest — a weekly round-table focusing on political news
 Trumpcast — originally focused on Trump's presidential run, it continued to cover his presidency
 Whistlestop — politics, hosted by John Dickerson
 Slate Presents — an anthology series, where each season functions as a stand-alone narrative miniseries. The first season, titled Standoff: What Happened at Ruby Ridge? was hosted by Ruth Graham, and examined the Ruby Ridge incident. The second season, hosted by Emily Bazelon, is titled Charged: A True Punishment Story and examines the workings of a special court in New York that focused on cases of illegal gun possession.

Slate's imprint, the Onward Project
 Happier with Gretchen Rubin
 Radical Candor — managers and relationships at work
 Side Hustle School — about making money on the side while having a main job, hosted by Chris Guillebeau

Previous shows 
Slate
 Spoiler Specials — film
 About Race
 Manners for the Digital Age

Other
 Politically Re-Active — political comedy, hosted by W. Kamau Bell and Hari Kondabolu, moved to Earwolf after Season 1.

See also 
 List of podcasting companies

References

External links 
 
 TheOnwardProject.com, Slate's imprint, a group of self-help podcasts

Companies based in Reston, Virginia
Megaphone (podcasting)
Podcasting companies
2020 mergers and acquisitions
American companies established in 2015
Mass media companies established in 2015
American subsidiaries of foreign companies
Spotify